This is a list of active and extinct volcanoes in Peru.

Notes

References 

John , Volcano Live, Volcanoes of Peru, Retrieved December 27, 2007
Peakware World Mountain Encyclopedia, Retrieved December 27, 2007

 
Volcanoes
Peru
.